Pavakkoothu is a 1990 Indian Malayalam-language film, directed by Sreekumar Krishnan Nair (as Sreekuttan) and produced by Panthalam Gopinath. The film stars Jayaram, Parvathy, Ranjini and Innocent. This film is a remake of 1984 American movie Micki & Maude.

The film has musical score by Johnson. Earlier in 1987,  this film was already made in Tamil, as Rettai Vaal Kuruvi (lit. 'Two-tailed Sparrow')  starring Mohan, Raadhika and Archana, with Direction by Balu Mahendra and Abdul Kader as producer,  with excellent music by Ilayaraja.

Plot
Pavakoothu is a story of a couple, Prakash and Sumitra. Prakash has an extra-marital affair with Krishna. Both his wife and girlfriend get pregnant at the same time. He tries to hide it from both, but finally they come to know the truth. Sumitra develops complications during delivery and the baby dies. She soon learns that she can never conceive a baby. Meanwhile, Krishna learns of Sumitra's situation, gives her baby to the couple and leaves.

Cast
Jayaram as Prakash
Parvathy Jayaram as Sumitra
Ranjini (actress) as Krishna
Innocent as Chakkochen
Mamukkoya as Kanjarakutti
M. G. Soman as M. P. Purushothaman Pilla
Nedumudi Venu as Padit Adithya Varma

Soundtrack
The music was composed by Johnson with lyrics by K Jayakumar.

References

External links
 

1990 films
1990s Malayalam-language films
Films shot in Thiruvananthapuram
Indian remakes of American films
Films directed by Sreekumar Krishnan Nair